Eutelsat 16C (formerly SESAT 1) is a satellite operated by Eutelsat Communications, originally the first of a series of SESAT (Siberia - Europe SATellite) satellites. It provides a wide range of telecommunications services over a very large geographical coverage area that extends from the Atlantic Ocean to Eastern Russia, including a large part of Siberia. The satellite also provide broadcasting services to Africa by means of steerable spotbeams.

On 29 January 2010, the satellite moved to 16° East to take over some services from the malfunctioning Eutelsat W2 satellite. The satellite was deorbited on 13 February 2018, after 17 years and 10 months of service, setting a record for in-orbit life.

References 

Communications satellites in geostationary orbit
Spacecraft launched in 2000
Satellites using the KAUR bus
Eutelsat satellites